The 2017 American Ultimate Disc League season was the sixth season for the league. The San Francisco FlameThrowers won the championship, the team's first title. The league featured twenty-four teams in four divisions, and for the first time, teams played interdivisional games. Eleven Sports Network joined the league as a broadcast partner for the first time, broadcasting a limited slate of games.

Regular season

Cross Coast Challenge
For the first time in the AUDL, cross-divisional games were held, counting towards the team's regular season record. Only the top two teams from each division in 2016 were involved in Cross Coast Challenge matches.

DC Breeze vs. Raleigh Flyers

Pittsburgh Thunderbirds vs. Seattle Cascades

Dallas Roughnecks vs. Madison Radicals

San Francisco FlameThrowers vs. Toronto Rush

Standings

East Division

Midwest Division

West Division

South Division

Results and Schedule

Week 1

Week 2

Week 3

Week 4

Week 5

Week 6

Week 7

Week 8

Week 9

Week 10

Week 11

Week 12

Week 13

Week 14

Week 15

Postseason
Championship Weekend was held August 26 and 27 at Complexe sportif Claude-Robillard in Montreal, Canada. The venue was chosen because of Montreal's support for their team, the Montreal Royal. The Dallas Roughnecks, Toronto Rush, Madison Radicals and San Francisco FlameThrowers qualified for the semifinals.

References

American Ultimate Disc League
2017 in American sports